Nate Wiggins (born August 28, 2003) is an American football cornerback for the Clemson Tigers.

High school career 
Wiggins originally attended Grady High School in Atlanta before transferring to Westlake High School for his senior season. In high school he played both wide receiver and cornerback but was primarily recruited as cornerback. At the conclusion of his high school career he would be selected to and play in the 2021 All-American Bowl. Wiggins was a 4 star prospect ranked the nations #7 overall corner prospect. He originally committed to play college football at LSU before flipping to Clemson University four days before national signing day.

College career 
In his freshman year, Wiggins saw limited playing time and struggled off of the field with both himself and head coach Dabo Swinney later describing him as immature. Wiggins entered his sophomore season with high expectations after he received praise from coaches and his teammates for his growth and maturation during the offseason. On September 24, 2022 against Wake Forest, Wiggins would struggle allowing multiple touchdowns and committing three pass interference penalties before breaking up a pass in overtime to win the game for Clemson. In the Tigers victory in the 2022 ACC Championship Game, Wiggins would have a 98 yard Pick-Six, the longest in ACC Championship history. Wiggins would finish the seasons with 30 tackles, 11 passes defended and one interception.

References

External links 
 Clemson Tigers bio

Living people
2003 births
American football cornerbacks
Clemson Tigers football players
Players of American football from Atlanta